The Seine at Argenteuil is an 1872 painting by Alfred Sisley, now in the Musée Faure in Aix-les-Bains. It was acquired by the doctor and art-lover Jean Faure, who left it to the city.

References

1872 paintings
Argenteuil
Maritime paintings
Paintings by Alfred Sisley